The 2015 Wychavon District Council election took place on 7 May 2015 to elect members of Wychavon District Council in Worcestershire, England. The whole council was up for election and the Conservative Party stayed in overall control of the council.

Background
After the 2011 elections to Wychavon District Council the Conservatives controlled the council with 39 councillors, while the Liberal Democrats had  five seats and there was one Labour Party councillor. In March 2012 the Conservative councillor for Lovett and North Claines, Alan Fisher, was suspended from the council for 6 months and on his return sat as an independent councillor. Another change came in December 2013 when the councillor for Elmley Castle and Somerville, Roma Kirke, left the Conservatives to become an independent, before resigning from the council in December 2014. A further seat was vacant at the 2015 election in Badsey ward after the death of Conservative councillor Reg Jakeman, leaving the Conservatives with 36 seats, Liberal Democrats five, Labour one and there was one independent.

The 2015 election was the first time where parliamentary, district and parish elections were held at the same time in Wychavon since Wychavon District Council was founded in 1974. Over 100 candidates stood in the district election, up from 72 in 2011 and the number of contested wards increased from 21 to 28. Four Conservative candidates were elected unopposed in Bredon, Drakes Broughton, Honeybourne and Pebworth, and Norton and Whittington wards.

Election result
The Conservatives retained control of the council after winning 39 seats, the same as in 2011, but up from immediately before the election. Labour lost their only seat on the council to the Conservatives in Droitwich West, after the Labour councillor Peter Pinfield stood down at the election, which meant the Conservatives won every seat in Droitwich.

The Liberal Democrats remained the largest opposition party on the council with five seats, after holding all of the seats they had been defending. The only other councillor elected was Ged Bearcroft for the UK Independence Party in Great Hampton ward. He defeated the Conservative councillor for the previous 32 years, John Smith, by 17 votes after a recount, to win the first ever UK Independence Party seat on Wychavon District Council. Overall turnout at the election was 70.19%, up from 47% in 2011 and 42% in 2007, and reaching 81.78% in Bowbrook.

Following the election the Conservative leader of the council, Paul Middlebrough, stepped down as leader after eight years and was succeeded by Linda Robinson.

Ward results

By-elections between 2015 and 2019
A by-election was held in Droitwich East on 30 July 2015 after the death of Conservative councillor Glenise Noyes. The seat was held for the Conservatives by Karen Tomalin with a majority of the 320 votes over Labour party candidate Jacqueline O'Reilly.

Two by-elections were held on 4 May 2017.

A by-election was held in Evesham South after the retirement of Ken Barclay on health grounds. The seat was held for the 
Conservatives by Matt Snape with a majority of 351 votes over the Liberal Democrat candidate Julie Haines.

A by-election was held in Droitwich South East following the death of Maureen Lawley. The seat was held for the 
Conservatives by Sital Harris with a majority of 903 votes over the Liberal Democrat candidate Adrian Key.

References

2015
2015 English local elections
May 2015 events in the United Kingdom